Terracom is a telecommunications company of Rwanda, which provides internet service and telephone service.  The company is headquartered in Kigali and its principal competitor in Rwanda is Rwandatel.

External links
 Terracom Communications official site

Economy of Kigali
Organisations based in Kigali
Telecommunications companies of Rwanda